Tymonove is a village in eastern Ukraine, specifically within Svatove Raion of Luhansk Oblast.

Demographics 
In the 2001 Ukrainian Census, native languages of the local population were distributed as follows:

Russian - 84.91%

Ukrainian - 14.94%

Others - 0.15%

Geography 
The village is approximately the source of the Krasna River.

History 
This village suffered through the Holodomor from 1932 to 1933, with at least 60 confirmed residents to have died from starvation.

During the German-Soviet War, Nazi German troops occupied this village from 1941 to 1943.

During the Russo-Ukrainian War, Russian Troops occupied this village in 2022, and as of November 2022 remains under occupation.

References

Villages in Svatove Raion